Adams Mills may refer to:

 Adams Mills, Ohio, small unincorporated community in Muskingum County, Ohio, United States
 Adams Mills, Michigan, populated place in Branch County, Michigan

See also 
 Adams Mill